Suldalsvatnet is the sixth-deepest lake in Norway.

References

Lakes of Rogaland
Suldal